The Golden Opportunities Mixtape is a free downloadable album by indie rock band Okkervil River. It contains eight covers and one live version of an original. It was released without any press as a free download from the band's website on December 12, 2007. It was listed as a Must Have Download in the 1044th Issue of Rolling Stone.

Track listing

Personnel 
 Will Sheff - Vocals, Acoustic Guitar, Harmonica
 Scott Brackett - Cornet, Keyboards, Piano on "April Anne"
 Brian Cassidy - Electric Guitar, Pedal Steel, Piano on "Listening to Otis Redding at Home During Christmas"
 Jonathan Meiburg - Vocals, Piano, Accordion
 Travis Nelsen - Drums
 Patrick Pestorius - Bass
 Justin Sherburn - Keyboards on "I Came Here to Say I'm Going Away"

External links
Official website with downloadable album
Pitchfork download link
Rolling Stone link

2007 albums
Okkervil River albums